Cosco or variation, may refer to:

Companies
 COSCO, the China Ocean Shipping Company; a holding company
 COSCO Shipping, a ship owner
 COSCO Shipping Holdings, a transport company
 COSCO Shipping Lines, a shipping line
 Cosco (India) Limited, a sports equipment company in India
 Cosco, a division of Dorel Industries

Other uses
 COSCO Tower, Victoria, Hong Kong; an office tower

See also

 
 Costco
 Cusco (disambiguation)
 COS (disambiguation), including companies named COS